Jesse Witten (born October 15, 1982 in Naples, Florida) is an American professional tennis player. He is a graduate of Lely High School and the University of Kentucky, where he majored in kinesiology.

College career
Witten had a highly successful college career at the University of Kentucky from 2001 to 2005. His achievements include:

Reached Final of NCAA Championships (2002)
Named the Intercollegiate Tennis Association (ITA) National Rookie of the Year (2002)
Named the SEC Rookie of the Year (2002)
Attained (4) first team All-SEC singles selections during his career
The University of Kentucky's first (5) time ITA All-American (4 singles; 1 doubles)
The University of Kentucky's first SEC Men's Tennis Player of the Year

Professional career

2001
Upon graduating from Lely High School, Witten was given a wildcard to the USTA Pro Circuit event in Seminole, Florida where he reached the semifinal.

2002
Witten was given a wildcard to the qualifying round of the US Open and also attempted to qualify for ATP events in Cincinnati, Ohio and Indianapolis, Indiana.

2003
The summer after his sophomore year of college, Witten played a handful of USTA Pro Circuit events and reach the semifinal of the event in Pittsburgh, Pennsylvania.

2004
As a wildcard, Witten won his first professional title at the USTA Pro Circuit event in Joplin, Missouri. He also reached two other finals at USTA Pro Circuit events in Peoria, Illinois and Lexington, Kentucky.

2005
Upon graduation from the University of Kentucky, Witten was given a lucky loser entrance into the ATP event in Indianapolis, Indiana where he lost in the first round to Andy Murray. He then won consecutive titles later in the summer on the ITF Circuit in Ecuador. He finished the year strong by reaching the semifinals of USTA Circuit events in Waco, Texas and Honolulu, Hawaii.

2006
His most successful year to date, Witten ended the year with a high of No. 171 on the ATP Tour. He attempted to qualify for the French Open and Wimbledon. He qualified for his first Grand Slam at the US Open where he lost in the first round to Paul Goldstein. He began the year by winning the title at the USTA Pro Circuit event in Tampa, Florida. He went on to win USTA Pro Circuit titles in Joplin, Missouri and Harlingen, Texas. He received a wildcard to the ATP event in Houston, Texas where he lost in the first round to Marcos Baghdatis. He also attempted to qualify for ATP events in Delray Beach, Florida, Newport, Rhode Island, Indianapolis, Indiana, and Cincinnati, Ohio. Witten made his main draw Grand Slam debut when he and Phillip Simmonds partnered in doubles at the US Open. They lost in the first round to the pairing of Alexander Peya and Björn Phau.

2007
Witten attempted to qualify for all four Grand Slam events.  He qualified for the ATP event in Memphis, Tennessee where he lost in the first round to Jürgen Melzer.  Nearly a year and a half since his last title, Witten won his seventh championship at the USTA Pro Circuit event in Tulsa, Oklahoma where he defeated Donald Young in the final. He reached the quarterfinals of five other USTA Pro Circuit events.

2009
Witten qualified for the 2009 U.S. Open, where he won his first round match against 29th seed Igor Andreev, 6–4, 6–0, 6–2. In second round, he defeated Máximo González 6–7(3), 6–4, 7–5, 6–3.  In the third round, Witten lost the match to Novak Djokovic, 7–6(2), 3–6, 6–7(2), 4–6. This match was notable because he was #276 in the rankings while Djokovic was #4, and Witten won the first set 7-6.

2010
Witten qualified into the 2010 French Open but was defeated in the first round by the #25 seed Marcos Baghdatis 6–3, 6–4, 6–3.

2011

2012
Witten won the Metzger Tournament at Colonial, and the 43rd annual City of Naples Tennis Championships at Cambier Park. Witten used protected ranking (367th) to get into the Panama City Challenger field after an 11-month break at pro level. He reached the semifinal, where he was forced to retire due to lower back injury.

2013
Witten won the 2013 F15 futures at Indian Harbour Beach.

2015 
Witten played in the USA F16 in Tampa, Florida, and lost in the semi-finals to Tennys Sandgren after beating Rhyne Williams in the quarter-finals.

2016 
At the Israel F7 ITF tournament, Witten reached the semi-finals and lost to fellow American Nicolas Meister. He won his 3rd Metzger Open.

2017 
Witten defeated Collin Johns 6-2 and 6-3 to win his 4th Metzger Open Championship.

2018 
Witten achieved his 3rd Metzger Open Championship in a row this year, and 5th in total.

Playing style
Witten employs an offensive baseline game although he is capable of playing an all-round game. His main strengths are his groundstrokes, foot speed, balance and return game. His groundstrokes are technically sound on both forehand and backhand, he hits the ball extremely early which creates great power, depth and consistency. Given his overweight appearance, Witten regularly surprises opponents with his speed and quality of play.

Personal
Witten began playing tennis at age 6. His father Paul works in construction management, and his mother Elaine is an optometrist. He has one older sister Sarah who is an elementary school teacher and also played tennis for the University of Kentucky. Jesse's younger brother Ben graduated in 2008 from the University of South Florida and works in Florida as a laboratory director. Witten likes every type of sport and is a big Miami Heat and Flint Tropics fan. He has his own tennis academy in his hometown of Naples.

References

External links
 Official Site
 
 Witten Recent Match Results
 Witten World Ranking History
 Jesse Witten (Facebook)
 The New York Observer

1982 births
Living people
American male tennis players
Kentucky Wildcats men's tennis players
Sportspeople from Naples, Florida
Tennis people from Florida